H. Chandrashekar, nicknamed Chandru, is an Indian former footballer who played for Hindustan Aeronautics Limited (HAL). He also coached HAL in their first I-League (then known as the National Football League). He is currently the technical manager of the team and was appointed after HAL were relegated from the I-League.

References

Indian footballers
Year of birth missing (living people)
Living people
Footballers from Bangalore

Association footballers not categorized by position